The 2015–16 Lebanese FA Cup was the 44th edition of the national football cup competition of Lebanon. It started with the First Round on 16 October 2015 and concluded with the final on 5 June 2016.

Defending champions Tripoli lost to Nejmeh on penalty shoot-out in the quarter-finals; Nejmeh went on to win their sixth title. The winner qualified for the 2017 AFC Cup group stage.

First round

Second round

Round of 16

Quarter-finals

Semi-finals

Final

References

Lebanese FA Cup seasons
FA Cup